Lausus is a minor character from the Roman mythology and the legend of the founding of Rome. He is the son of Albe's king Numitor and he was to succeed him, but he was killed by his uncle Amulius who wanted to seize the throne.

His history is written in a few words by Ovid ; with Dionysius of Halicarnassus, the son of Numitor killed on Amulius' order is Aegestus. This character does not appear in Tite-Live, nor in The life of Romulus and Remus of Plutarch.

In the story of Dionysius of Halicarnassus, Amulius ambushed Aegestus or Lausus while the latter was hunting. He tried to pretend that he was killed by brigands, but many Albani did not believe this story.

According to Paul Marius Martin, this character was not one of the ancient versions of the legend of the origins of Rome: "This character was invented to reinforce the tyrannical color of the reign of Amulius, who moreover had recourse to eliminate his nephew, to the classic hunting cunning."

References 

Characters in Roman mythology